Canadian Pacific 1201 is a 4-6-2 Pacific steam locomotive. Built by the Canadian Pacific Railway's Angus shops in Montreal, Quebec, in 1944, No. 1201 was used to pull passenger trains across Ontario and Quebec. After the Canadian Pacific removed the locomotive from service, the railway put the No. 1201 in storage at the Angus shops yard, and it was donated to the Canada Science and Technology Museum six years later. In 1973, No. 1201 was removed from the museum to be restored to operating condition. Subsequently, No. 1201 pulled a variety of excursion trains and participated in a variety of special events, such as the Canadian Pacific centennial of 1985 and the 1986 Steam Exposition. , No. 1201 is stored out of service at the Canada Science and Technology Museum in Ottawa. It is the oldest survivor of the Canadian Pacific's G5 class locomotives, and the last remaining locomotive of two prototypes of the class to be preserved.

Surviving sister engines 
 No. 1238 is in storage at the Prairie Dog Central Railway in Winnipeg, Manitoba, Canada.
 No. 1246 is in storage at the Railroad Museum of New England in Thomaston, Connecticut, United States.
 No. 1278 is on static display at the Age of Steam Roundhouse in Sugarcreek, Ohio, United States.
 No. 1286 is in storage at the Prairie Dog Central Railway in Winnipeg.
 No. 1293 is on display at the Age of Steam Roundhouse in Sugarcreek, waiting for a rebuild.

See also 

 Canadian Pacific 2317
 Canadian Pacific 2816
 Canadian National 6060

References 

4-6-2 locomotives
1201
Preserved steam locomotives of Canada
Individual locomotives of Canada
Standard gauge locomotives of Canada
Railway locomotives introduced in 1944
Passenger locomotives